"In Your Bed" is a song by Spanish singer Blas Cantó. It was released as a digital download and for streaming on 3 March 2017, as the lead single from Cantó's debut studio album Complicado. The song was written by Anders Bagge, Arne Hovda, Blair MacKichan and Hugo Solis. The song peaked at number 57 on the Spanish Singles Chart.

Music video
A music video to accompany the release of "In Your Bed" was first released onto YouTube on 3 March 2017.

Track listing

Accolades

Charts

Release history

References

2017 singles
2016 songs
Songs written by Anders Bagge
Songs written by Blair MacKichan
Blas Cantó songs